The silver bull of Delphi is the first large-scale statue made all from forged metal – a bull made of sheets of silver. The sixty silver leaves that were found crumbled and damaged in a depository of the Delphic Sanctuary, after long and detailed conservation work, managed to revive, even if only in our imagination, the silver bull statue.  The shape of the statue was created by a wooden core, which was filled with some malleable material: clay, wax or plaster. The silver leaves were applied on top of it and were secured with nails. The details of the bull (horns, ears, hooves etc) were gold-plated.

It is apparent that the current form of the bull is unable to deliver its volume and plasticity of the past.  The interior of the core was lost and its dimensions were altered, since its initial total length seems that reached about 2.5 meters. It was, however, a valuable Ionic offering that dates back to around the 6th century B.C.

References

Silver Bull